Cape Alexander is a cape which forms the south end of Churchill Peninsula and the east side of the entrance to Cabinet Inlet, on the east coast of Graham Land. It was charted by the Falkland Islands Dependencies Survey (FIDS) and photographed from the air by the Ronne Antarctic Research Expedition (RARE) in December 1947.

Cape Alexander was named by the FIDS for Rt. Hon. Albert V. Alexander, M.P., First Lord of the Admiralty.

Further reading 
 R. K. Headland, Chronological List of Antarctic Expeditions and Related Historical Events, P 353
 Pedro Skvarca, Changes and surface features of the Larsen Ice Shelf, Antarctica, derived from Landsat and Kosmos mosaics, Annals of Glaciology, Volume 20 1994, PP 6–12
 NATIONAL GEOSPATIAL-INTELLIGENCE AGENCY, SAILING DIRECTIONS & ENROUTE, ANTARCTICA, P 106

References 

Headlands of Graham Land
Foyn Coast